Gérard Banide (born 12 July 1936) is a French former football coach. He is the father of Laurent Banide.

External links and references

Profile

1936 births
Living people
Sportspeople from Paris
French football managers
AS Monaco FC managers
FC Mulhouse managers
Olympique de Marseille managers
RC Strasbourg Alsace managers
INF Vichy managers